Cyril Fletcher (25 June 1913 – 2 January 2005) was an English comedian, actor and businessman. His catchphrase was 'Pin back your lugholes'. He was best known for his "Odd Odes", which later formed a section of the television show That's Life!, a role for which he was approached in error. So successful was he however, that he stayed on the show from 1973 to 1981. He first began performing the Odd Odes in 1937, long before they first appeared on television (though he did appear on pre World War II television).

Fletcher came up with the idea when he was short of material for a radio show. The first, Odd Ode, was a comic, yet sentimental, reading of Edgar Wallace's war poem Dreamin' of Thee. Following this broadcast, he was given a regular programme on Radio Luxembourg; it was this show that brought him to national attention. He called himself "the odd oder".

He also appeared as a panellist on the popular panel show on BBC, What's My Line?, that ran from 1951 to 1963. He was the presenter of Central TV's Gardening Today for fourteen years, and Channel Television's Cyril Fletcher's TV Garden, and ran from 1990 to 1992, for two years. He alleged defamation when Rowan Atkinson referred to him, in a Not The Nine O’Clock News sketch as “a cross eyed baboon”. As a sufferer of crossed eyes, Fletcher considered litigation but over time they became friends.

Fletcher was born in Watford, the son of a solicitor, who was the Friern Barnet town clerk. Following schooling at Woodhouse School, North Finchley, where he first began to entertain by composing witty poems about his schoolmasters, he graduated from the Guildhall School of Music and Drama.

A Freemason and a successful businessman, he believed it important to diversify in such a fickle business as show business. He founded Associated Speakers, an agency for after-dinner speakers, on whose books were included The Duke of Bedford and Lord Longford, as well as himself.

Personal life
He and his wife, Betty Astell, were married from 18 May 1941 until his death on 2 January 2005, she died just under seven months later. The couple had a daughter, Jill Fletcher, an actress and comedian.

Selected filmography
 Yellow Canary (1943)
 Nicholas Nickleby (1947)
 A Piece of Cake (1948)

References

External links

Associated Speakers

1913 births
2005 deaths
Freemasons of the United Grand Lodge of England
English male comedians
People from Watford
Alumni of the Guildhall School of Music and Drama
People educated at Friern Barnet Grammar School
20th-century English comedians
21st-century English comedians